Creuset may refer to:
Le Creuset, French manufacturer
Rau Le Creuset, Japanese cartoon character

See also
Creusot (disambiguation)